Konstantin Vladimirovich Arnoldi (5 January 190112 December, 1982) was a Soviet and Russian biologist and entomologist. He was the son of Vladimir Arnoldi.

1901 births
1982 deaths
20th-century biologists
Recipients of the Order of the Red Banner of Labour
Myrmecologists
Zoologists with author abbreviations
Russian biologists
Russian entomologists
Soviet biologists

Soviet entomologists
Burials at Pyatnitskoye Cemetery